Yuvileiny Stadium is a football stadium in Sumy, Ukraine, home grounds to both local teams Sumy and Alians. The building was put into operation on September 20, 2001. The stadium has a total capacity of 25,830 spectators.

The stadium has hosted numerous top-tier matches in the Ukrainian Super Cup and Ukrainian Cup. Otherwise, the stadium hosts most of Alians' matches in the Ukrainian First League as well as home matches for Sumy. The stadium's first match held an attendance record of about 29,300 spectators when Spartak Sumy played Naftovyk Okhtyrka in 2003.

History
Yuvileiny Stadium is located nearby Kozhedub Park near downtown Sumy. Prior to its construction, on the site of Yuvileiny was Spartak Stadium, built in 1949. In 1968, it was extensively reconstructed to accommodate 12,000 spectators, and in the late 80s it was demolished in order to build a new stadium capable of holding 35,000 spectators.

The stadium project was developed by Ukrainian architects Volodymyr Bykov and Ivan Lukash, for which they were awarded the State Prize of Ukraine. Construction of the new arena began on September 2, 1999, when the first pylon was hammered in. The stadium was officially opened on September 20, 2001, shortly after the celebration of the 10th anniversary of Ukraine's independence and on the eve of the 350th anniversary of Sumy, which was founded in 1652. At the time of opening, the stadium officially accommodated about 28,000 spectators. Initially, some of these spectating places were standing only. However, subsequently, all these spots were equipped with individual seats. Almost all of the stadium's areas for spectators are under a canopy, with the exception of the first rows of the lower tier.

On July 11, 2009, the stadium hosted a match for the 2009 Ukrainian Super Cup between Dynamo Kyiv and Vorskla Poltava. Yuvileiny also hosted the Final of the Ukrainian Cup between Dynamo Kyiv and Shakhtar Donetsk on May 25, 2011, with a total of 27,800 spectators.

On July 22, 2016, the Executive Committee of the Football Federation of Ukraine decided to hold the final of the Ukrainian Cup in Sumy. But under a number of conditions, such as increasing the number of seats to 30,000 seats, bringing the stadium and territory in line with regulatory standards, completing work on the installation of a fire system, this happened to not be the case. On December 13, 2016, information was published that Kharkiv took away from Sumy the right to host the final of the cup.

On August 20, 2016, the stadium hosted a Premier League match between Olympic Donetsk and Olexandria. After that, Olympic decided to hold all of their home matches of the first round of the Ukrainian Cup at Yubileiny.

In 2018-2020, Amateur League club LSG Syrovatka began to host their home matches at the stadium, and subsequently in 2020 the club was renamed to FC Sumy.

Characteristics
The drainage system and the field-heating system were installed by Eleter, while the stadium lighting is ensured by Vatra. The field scoreboard is made by Videoton.

References

External links
 Link to the information about the stadium on the web-site of the Sumy City Council.
 Stadium information at the official website of PFC Sumy
 Футбол и Сумы: история и текущее положение. football.ua. 10 April 2020

2001 establishments in Ukraine
Football venues in Ukraine
Buildings and structures in Sumy Oblast
Sport in Sumy
Sports venues in Sumy Oblast